Trevor McKay Reilly (born January 17, 1988) is a former American football outside linebacker. He was drafted by the New York Jets in the seventh round of the 2014 NFL Draft. He played college football at Utah.

College career
During his tenure, he appeared in 48 games accumulating 235 total tackles, 37 tackles for loss, 8.5 sacks, eight forced fumbles and two interceptions. His senior season, he set career highs in tackles (100), tackles for loss (16) and sacks (8.5) that led him to being named a first-team All-Pac-12 selection. The Bleacher Report named Trevor Reilly a First-team All-American on December 3, 2013.

Professional career

New York Jets
Reilly was drafted by the New York Jets in the seventh round (233rd overall) of the 2014 NFL Draft.

Reilly was waived/injured on September 3, 2016. After going unclaimed on waivers and cut, Reilly reverted to the team's injured reserve list. He subsequently reached an injury settlement with the Jets and was released from the reserve list on September 6, 2016.

New England Patriots
On October 20, 2016, the New England Patriots signed Reilly to their practice squad.

Miami Dolphins
On December 19, 2016, the Miami Dolphins signed Reilly off the Patriots' practice squad. He was waived on September 3, 2017 and was signed to the practice squad the next day. He was released on October 10, 2017.

New England Patriots (second stint)
On October 12, 2017, Reilly was signed to the Patriots' practice squad. He was promoted to the active roster on October 25, 2017. On December 26, 2017, Reilly was waived by the Patriots. He was re-signed to the practice squad on January 3, 2018.

Salt Lake Stallions
In late 2018, Reilly joined the Salt Lake Stallions of the Alliance of American Football. The league ceased operations in April 2019.

Coaching career
Reilly began his coaching career at the University of Utah as a student-assistant coach in 2018. In 2021 he became a graduate assistant at Jackson State Tigers. In 2023 Reilly joined Deion Sanders at Colorado Buffaloes as the Special Teams Coordinator.

References

External links
Utah Utes bio

1988 births
Living people
American football defensive ends
American football linebackers
Miami Dolphins players
New England Patriots players
New York Jets players
People from Valley Center, California
Sportspeople from San Diego County, California
Salt Lake Stallions players
Utah Utes football players
Colorado Buffaloes football coaches